Hypoptopoma inexspectatum is a species of catfish in the family Loricariidae. It is native to the Paraná and Paraguay basins in tropical South America. It reaches 7.1 cm (2.8 inches) SL.

References 

Hypoptopomatini
Fish described in 1893
Taxa named by Eduardo Ladislao Holmberg